False Ambition is a 1918 silent drama film produced and released by the Triangle Film Corporation. Directed by Gilbert P. Hamilton, the film stars Alma Rubens.

Cast
 Alma Rubens - Judith/Zariska
 Peggy Pearce - Felicity
 Alberta Lee - Anna
 Edward Peil - David Strong
 Walt Whitman - Mark Strong
 Iris Ashton - Mrs. Dorian
 Myrtle Rishell - Mrs. Pemberton
 Lillian Langdon - Mrs. Van Dixon
 Lee Phelps - Peter Van Dixon
 Ward Caulfield - John Van Dixon
 Lee Hill - Paul Vincent
 Alice Crawford - Lucy Vernon

Preservation
False Ambition is now a lost film.

References

External links
 
 
Lantern slide to the film (Wayback Machine archived)

1918 films
1918 drama films
Silent American drama films
American silent feature films
American black-and-white films
Films based on short fiction
Triangle Film Corporation films
Lost American films
Films directed by Gilbert P. Hamilton
1918 lost films
Lost drama films
1910s American films
1910s English-language films